Panguidae is an extinct family of aculeate wasps, known exclusively from the mid-Cretaceous (latest Albian-earliest Cenomanian) Burmese amber of Myanmar. The family was initially named for the genus Pangu, with the genus Prosphex, originally considered incertae sedis, was suggested to be a member of the family in a later publication. Their relationships with other aculates are uncertain, and they are considered to be the only members of the superfamily Panguoidea. A specimen of Prosphex was observed with a substantial amount of angiosperm pollen near and within its mouth, implying that it was pollenivorous, and acted as a pollinator for flowering plants.

References 

Prehistoric insect families
Apocrita